Anesthesia & Analgesia is a monthly peer-reviewed medical journal covering anesthesia, pain management, and perioperative medicine that was established in 1922.

It is published by Lippincott Williams & Wilkins on behalf of the International Anesthesia Research Society. Its editor-in-chief is Jean-Francois Pittet (University of Alabama at Birmingham).

According to the Journal Citation Reports, the journal has a 2020 impact factor of 5.178, ranking it seventh out of 33 journals in the category "Anesthesiology".

A companion journal, A&A Practice is also published.

See also

 List of medical journals

References

External links 
 

Anesthesiology and palliative medicine journals
English-language journals
Lippincott Williams & Wilkins academic journals
Monthly journals
Publications established in 1922
Academic journals associated with learned and professional societies